Upper Bogue is a stream in the U.S. state of Mississippi.

Upper Bogue is a name partially derived from the Choctaw language meaning "upper creek".

References

Rivers of Mississippi
Rivers of Bolivar County, Mississippi
Mississippi placenames of Native American origin